Jordanoleiopus binigromaculipennis is a species of beetle in the family Cerambycidae. It was described by Breuning in 1977.

References

Jordanoleiopus
Beetles described in 1977
Taxa named by Stephan von Breuning (entomologist)